'Ubeidiya, some 3 km south of the Sea of Galilee, in the Jordan Rift Valley, Israel, is an archaeological site of the early Pleistocene,  years ago, preserving traces of one of the earliest migrations of Homo erectus out of Africa, with (as of 2014) only the site of Dmanisi in Georgia being older. The site yielded hand axes of the Acheulean type, but very few human remains. The animal remains include a hippopotamus' femur bone, and an immensely large pair of horns belonging to a species of extinct bovid.

The site was discovered in 1959 and was first excavated between 1960 and 1974.

The site is distinct from nearby Tell Ubeidiya.

Etymology

The prehistoric site is named for the historical Palestinian village of Ubeidiya, which was centered on Tell 'Ubeidiya.

The name Ubeidiya comes from the Arabic word obeid, meaning "little slave", while a connection with the biblical name Obadiah cannot be ruled out. Abeed is the Arabic word for slave.

Location
'Ubeidiya is located between the village Menahemia and Kibbutz Beit Zera, one kilometer northwest of the latter.

The prehistoric remains were found at a site distinct from the archaeological mound (tell) known as Tell 'Ubeidiya, some 400 metres northwest of the tell.

Excavation history
The prehistoric site was discovered in May 1959 near the tell, south of the Yavne'el stream (Wadi Fidjdjas), by a member of Kibbutz Afikim who was levelling the ground for agriculture with a bulldozer. Excavations at the site began in 1960, led by Moshe Stekelis, assisted by zoologist Georg Haas, geologists Leo Picard and Nachman Shulman and several archaeology students, including Ofer Bar-Yosef and Naama Goren-Inbar. After Stekelis' death in 1967, Bar-Yosef and Goren-Inbar conducted the excavations.

Findings

Prehistoric remains starting from about 1.7 Mya (million years ago), more recently redated biochronologically to 1.5 Mya, were discovered in the excavations, within about 60 layers of soil within which were found human bones and remains of ancient animals. These include some of the oldest remains found outside Africa, and more than 10,000 ancient stone tools.

Today, the findings are preserved in the Israel Museum in Jerusalem.

Human skeletal remains
In February 2022, archaeologists from the Israel Antiquities Authority, led by Professor Ella Been, announced the discovery of a 1.5-million-year-old complete hominin vertebra. According to the researchers, the fossilized bone belonging to a juvenile between the ages of 6-12 is the oldest evidence of ancient hominins in the Middle East. This latest discovery has shed new light on telling the story of prehistoric migration. The size and shape of the lower lumbar vertebra, dated to the Early Pleistocene, indicates that it belonged to an individual from a different species than the one represented by the 1.8-million-year-old skull unearthed at Dmanisi in the Republic of Georgia. After this discovery, Dr Barzilai assumed that different human species produced the stone tool industries present at Ubeidiya and Dmanisi, respectively. The Ubeidiya child was an estimated 155 cm tall at death, its predicted adult size being, in the conservative estimation of  Prof. Ella Been, of more than 1.8 metres tall. Regarding the species the hominin child belonged to, the authors of the paper published in the Scientific Reports journal are adopting there the cautious attitude of declaring it as "comparable to other early Pleistocene large-bodied hominins from Africa", but due to a lack of information about its morphology beyond what can be gleaned from a vertebra, they are declining to identify its species other than it being too large to belong to H. habilis. In an interview with the Israeli newspaper Haaretz, however, Dr. Alon Barash, a palaeoanthropologist, quite categorically declares it to be a H. erectus.

Other hominin skeletal material from Ubeidiya previously studied consists of a molar, a further minor finding, and a highly worn right lateral lower incisor. The analysis of the more recently discovered incisor identified the hominin species to which it belongs as one of the three extant during the Lower Pleistocene, but could not securely distinguish to which of them: Homo habilis, H. ergaster, or H. erectus. The age of the deposits and the location within the Levantine corridor indirectly suggest it belonging to a H. ergaster hominin.

Habitation remains and environment
The site also features rock surfaces in which the prehistoric man lived during the Pleistocene period. As a result of geologic breakage and foldage activity, the rock surfaces are now inclined at an angle of 70 degrees. It is thought that the area used to feature a pristine lake along which Homo erectus lived after his exodus from Africa. The finds discovered at the site validate this theory.

Nearby Tell 'Ubeidiya

Ruins of the  Palestinian  village of Ubeidiya, Tiberias, depopulated in 1948, are still visible on a nearby tell.

On the mound once stood a walled city which controlled the crossroads of the Jordan Valley and the road linking the Golan Heights to the port of Acre. Tell Ubeidiya is considered as one of the possible candidates for the Bronze Age city of Yenoam, known from Egyptian sources, but this is a matter of speculation.

A 2012 trial excavation along the western fringes of the tell uncovered remains from the Early and Late Bronze, Iron, Persian, Roman, Byzantine, Early Islamic, Crusader, Mamluk and Ottoman periods.

References

 (Free access only for abstract.)
 (Free access only for abstract.)

1959 archaeological discoveries
Paleolithic sites
Pleistocene
Archaeological sites in Israel
Prehistoric sites in Israel
Sea of Galilee